Indian Telly Award for Best Onscreen Couple is an award given by Indiantelevision as part of its annual Indian Telly Awards for TV serials, to recognize a pair that have stood out and been appreciated by the Indian audience and given an outstanding performance as a couple onscreen.

The award was first awarded in 2002. The category was removed in 2008 and the award was not awarded until 2012. Only once, in 2012, the award was awarded with prior nominations.

Superlatives

List of winners (Popular)

2000s
2001Not Awarded
2002Cezanne Khan & Shweta Tiwari as Anurag Basu and Prerna Sharma for Kasautii Zindagii Kay
Hiten Tejwani & Gauri Pradhan Tejwani as Pratham and Gauri for Kutumb
 Juhi Parmar & Hussain Kuwajerwala as Kumkum Wadhawa and Sumit Wadhawa for Kumkum 
 Puneet Vasishtha & Aparna Tilak as Kabir and Sanjana for Kohi Apna Sa
2003Cezanne Khan & Shweta Tiwari as Anurag Basu & Prerna Basu for Kasautii Zindagii Kay 
Rajeev Khandelwal & Aamna Shariff - Kahin To Hoga as Sujal Garewal and Kashish Sinha
 Hiten Tejwani & Gauri Pradhan Tejwani - Kyunki Saas Bhi Kabhi Bahu Thi as Karan and Nandini
 Juhi Parmar & Hussain Kuwajerwala - Kumkum as Kumkum and Sumit Wadhawa
2004Rajeev Khandelwal & Aamna Shariff as Sujal Garewal and Kashish Sinha for Kahin To Hoga
 Cezanne Khan & Shweta Tiwari - Kasautii Zindagii Kay as Anurag Basu and Prerna Sharma
 Hiten Tejwani & Gauri Pradhan Tejwani - Kyunki Saas Bhi Kabhi Bahu Thi as Karan and Nandini
 Juhi Parmar & Hussain Kuwajerwala - Kumkum as Kumkum and Sumit Wadhawa
2005Eijaz Khan & Anita Hassanandani- Kkavyanjali as Kkavya Nanda and Anjali Salve
Ronit Roy & Shweta Tiwari - Kasautii Zindagii Kay as Rishab Bajaj and Prerna Bajaj
 Hiten Tejwani & Gauri Pradhan Tejwani - Kyunki Saas Bhi Kabhi Bahu Thi as Karan and Nandini
 Juhi Parmar & Hussain Kuwajerwala - Kumkum as Kumkum and Sumit Wadhawa
 Rajeev Khandelwal & Aamna Shariff - Kahin To Hoga as Sujal Garewal and Kashish Garewal
2006Ram Kapoor & Prachi Desai for Kasamh Se as Jai Walia and Bani Dixit
2007Sharad Malhotra & Divyanka Tripathi forBanoo Main Teri Dulhann as Sagar Pratap Singh and Vidya Pratap Singh
Cezanne Khan & Shweta Tiwari - Kasautii Zindagii Kay as Anurag Basu and Prerna Bajaj
 Hiten Tejwani & Gauri Pradhan Tejwani - Kyunki Saas Bhi Kabhi Bahu Thi as Karan and Nandini
 Juhi Parmar & Hussain Kuwajerwala - Kumkum as Kumkum and Sumit Wadhawa
 Ram Kapoor & Prachi Desai - Kasamh Se as Jai Udai Walia and Bani Nishikant
2008Not Awarded
2009Not Awarded

2010s

2010 Not Awarded
2011No Award
2012Barun Sobti & Sanaya Irani for Iss Pyaar Ko Kya Naam Doon? as Arnav Singh Raizada and Khushi Kumari Gupta
Sushant Singh Rajput & Ankita Lokhande- Pavitra Rishta Manav Deshmukh & Archana Deshmukh
Samir Soni & Kirti Nagpure- Parichay—Nayee Zindagi Kay Sapno Ka as Kunal Chopra & Siddhi Chopra
Anas Rashid & Deepika Singh- Diya Aur Baati Hum as Sooraj Rathi & Sandhya Rathi
Ram Kapoor & Saakshi Tanwar- Bade Acche Lagte Hain as Ram Kapoor & Priya Kapoor
Gurmeet Choudhary & Drashti Dhami- Geet - Hui Sabse Parayi as Maan Singh Khurana & Geet Khurana
2013Vivian Dsena & Drashti Dhami - Madhubala - Ek Ishq Ek Junoon as Rishabh Kundra and Madhubala Kundra
Rithvik Dhanjani & Asha Negi- Pavitra Rishta Arjun Kirlodskar & Purvi Kirlodskar
Anas Rashid & Deepika Singh- Diya Aur Baati Hum as Sooraj Rathi & Sandhya Rathi
Ram Kapoor & Saakshi Tanwar- Bade Acche Lagte Hain as Ram Kapoor & Priya Kapoor
Karan Singh Grover & Surbhi Jyoti- Qubool Hai as Asad Ahmed Khan & Zoya Farooki
Gurmeet Choudhary & Kratika Sengar- Punar Vivah as Yash Scindia & Aarti Scindia
2014Karan Patel & Divyanka Tripathi - Yeh Hai Mohabbatein as Raman Kumar Bhalla and Dr Ishita Iyer Bhalla & Nakuul Mehta & Disha Parmar - Pyaar Ka Dard Hai Meetha Meetha Pyaara Pyaara as Aditya Kumar and Pankhuri Aditya Kumar
Vivian Dsena & Drashti Dhami - Madhubala - Ek Ishq Ek Junoon as Rishabh Kundra and Madhubala Kundra
Anas Rashid & Deepika Singh- Diya Aur Baati Hum as Sooraj Rathi & Sandhya Rathi
Gautam Rode & Jennifer Winget - Saraswatichandra as Saras and Kumud
Rajat Tokas & Paridhi Sharma - Jodha Akbar as Akbar and Jodha
Ashish Sharma & Sanaya Irani - Rang Rasiya as Rudra & Parvati
2015Karan Patel & Divyanka Tripathi - Yeh Hai Mohabbatein as Raman Kumar Bhalla and Dr Ishita Iyer Bhalla and Shabbir Ahluwalia & Sriti Jha - Kumkum Bhagya as Abhishek Mehra and Pragya Arora
Ravi Dubey & Nia Sharma- Jamai Raja as Siddharth Khurana & Roshni Khurana
Shakti Arora & Radhika Madan- Meri Aashiqui Tum Se Hi as Ranveer Vaghela & Ishani Vaghela
Rajeev Khandelwal & Kritika Kamra- Reporters as Kabir Sharma & Ananya Kashyap
Apurva Agnihotri & Sonali Bendre- Ajeeb Daastaan Hai Ye as Vikram Ahuja & Shobha Sachdev
Anas Rashid & Deepika Singh as Sooraj Rathi & Sandhya Rathi for Diya Aur Baati Hum
Parth Samthaan & Niti Taylor as Manik Malhotra & Nandini Murthy for Kaisi Yeh Yaariaan
2019Parth Samthaan & Erica Fernandes as Anurag Basu & Prerna Sharma for Kasautii Zindagii Kay
Harshad Chopda & Jennifer Winget as Aditya Hooda & Zoya Siddiqui for Bepannah
Surbhi Chandna & Nakuul Mehta as Annika Trivedi & Shivaay Singh Oberoi for Ishqbaaaz
Shraddha Arya & Dheeraj Dhoopar as Preeta Arora & Karan Luthra for Kundali Bhagya
Randeep Rai & Ashi Singh as Sameer Maheshwari & Naina Agarwal for Yeh Un Dinon Ki Baat Hai
Mohsin Khan & Shivangi Joshi as Kartik Goenka & Naira Singhania for Yeh Rishta Kya Kehlata Hai
Pearl V Puri & Surbhi Jyoti as Mahir Sehgal & Bela Sehgal for Naagin 3
Zain Imam & Aditi Rathore as Neil Khanna & Avni Ayesha for Naamkarann
Rubina Dilaik & Vivian Dsena as Soumya Singh & Harman Singh for Shakti - Astitva Ke Ehsaas Ki
Divyanka Tripathi & Karan Patel as Ishita Bhalla & Raman Bhalla for Yeh Hai Mohabbatein
Adnan Khan & Eisha Singh as Kabeer Ahmed & Zara Siddiqui for Ishq Subhan Allah
Vijayendra Kumeria & Meera Deosthale as Suraj Rajvanshi & Chakor Rajvanshi for Udaan
Shabbir Ahluwalia & Sriti Jha as Abhishek Mehra & Pragya Mehra for Kumkum Bhagya
Sumedh Mudgalkar & Mallika Singh for Radhakrishn

Jury awards 

 2019Sumedh Mudgalkar & Mallika Singh as Krishna & Radha for RadhaKrishn

References

Indian Telly Awards